The 2004 Tour de Corse (formally the 48. Tour de Corse - Rallye de France) was the fourteenth round of the 2004 World Rally Championship season. The race was held over three days between 15 October and 17 October 2004, and was based in Ajaccio, France. Ford's Markko Märtin won the race, his 4th win in the World Rally Championship.

Background

Entry list

Itinerary
All dates and times are CEST (UTC+2).

Results

Overall

World Rally Cars

Classification

Special stages

Championship standings
Bold text indicates 2004 World Champions.

Production World Rally Championship

Classification

Special stages

Championship standings

References

External links 
 Official website of the World Rally Championship

Tour de Corse
Tour de Corse
Tour de Corse